Saint Urban of Langres (327 – c. 390) was a French saint and bishop. He served as the sixth bishop of Langres from 374 until his death. Saint Leodegaria was his sister.

Life
Urban was the bishop of Langres, France, beginning in 374. Legend states that soon after taking his position, political turmoil erupted, and he was driven from his house. St. Urban hid from his persecutors in a vineyard.  The vine-dressers in the area concealed him, and he took the opportunity to convert them to Christianity.  Those same vine-dressers then helped him in his covert ministry, as he moved from one town to another via their vineyards. Urban developed great affection to all the people in the wine industry, and they for him. Urban is thus the patron saint of vine-dressers.

Veneration
The feast day of St. Urban is 2 April, or 23 January in Langres, France. The cult of St. Urban of Langres were closely associated with the weather.  Several old German sayings reflect this:

Pankraz und Urban ohne Regen / bringen großen Erntesegen[The feast days of] Pancras and Urban without rain/ bring big rich harvests.Pancras, one of the so-called Ice Saints, was a saint closely associated with the weather.Das Wetter auf St. Urban zeigt des Herbstes Wetter an.The weather on St. Urban's Day will indicate what the autumn weather will be like.These are sayings that are similar to those said of the feast days of Swithun, Medardus, Godelieve, and other "weather saints."  Another saying ties more closely to Urban's particular patronage of wine growers:Ist Sonnenschein am Urbanstag / gedeiht der Wein nach alter SagIf there is sunshine on St. Urban's Day/ the wine thrives afterwards, they say''

References

External links

Bishops of Langres
4th-century bishops in Gaul
327 births
390 deaths
4th-century Christian saints
Gallo-Roman saints